Eden Sonja Jane Riegel (born January 1, 1981) is an American actress. She portrayed Bianca Montgomery in the daytime drama All My Children, and propelled the character into a gay icon, as well as a popular figure within the medium. Nominated previously on multiple occasions, she received a Daytime Emmy Award for the role in 2005.

In addition to her work on All My Children, Riegel has guest starred in several prime time shows, as well as film, and starred as character "Eden" in the web series Imaginary Bitches. She assumed the role of Heather Stevens on The Young and the Restless from April 2010 to November 2011.

Riegel is also a prolific voice actress, providing the voices for many video games and animated projects. She is the voice director for Disney's animated TV series Amphibia, The Owl House and The Ghost and Molly McGee.

Early life
Born to Kurt and Lenore Riegel on New Year's Day 1981 in Washington, D.C., Riegel was raised in a Virginia suburb and became interested in acting while watching her brother, Sam, perform dinner theater, which she later joined in for $10 a week. Her big break came when she won the role of Cosette in Les Misérables, leading to other roles on and off-Broadway. She graduated from the Professional Children's School and attended Harvard University, with ambitions to become a lawyer, but later left the institution. In 2000, she served as an intern at the White House for the summer.

Career

All My Children
From July 2000 to February 2005, Riegel portrayed the role of Bianca Montgomery on the American ABC soap opera All My Children. During the 2004-2005 baby switch storyline, when Bianca's daughter is kidnapped and switched with the son of Babe Carey Chandler (Alexa Havins), Riegel also portrayed Bianca on fellow ABC soap opera One Life to Live. In December 2000, Riegel's character "comes out" to her mother, Erica Kane (Susan Lucci), becoming the only lesbian on a daytime soap opera at that time. In 2003, the kiss between Bianca and character Lena Kundera (Olga Sosnovska) made history when it became the first lesbian kiss to appear on American daytime television. In 2005, with Lena out of the picture, Bianca shares a kiss with close friend and confidante Maggie Stone (Elizabeth Hendrickson), making TV Guide's list of best same-sex kisses on television. Riegel's character was awarded the first Gay & Lesbian Alliance Against Defamation award for "Favorite OUT Image of the Year" in 2004. Lesbianation.com, self-proclaimed as the leading online community for lesbians, voted Eden Riegel as Number 7 on their top ten list of Women We Love: The Ladies of June '06, stating, "We were swamped with requests to add All My Children hottie Eden Riegel to our list this month — and here she is!"

Riegel was nominated for three Daytime Emmy Awards for Outstanding Younger Actress in a Drama Series (2001, 2002, 2004) before finally winning the award in 2005. She won two Soap Opera Digest Awards in 2001 for Outstanding Female Newcomer, and in 2005 for Outstanding Younger Lead Actress. Later that year, Riegel, along with best friend and co-star Elizabeth Hendrickson, exited All My Children, with their last show airing on February 24, 2005. Riegel then moved to Los Angeles, California to pursue other acting ventures. She made a brief return to the soap opera when her television mother (Erica) marries in May 2005, and returned for an extended stay from December 16, 2005 to January 10, 2006. Bianca's daughter, Miranda, was aged accordingly. Riegel returned again for a short visit from May 24, 2006 until mid-June, in a storyline connected with Bianca's sister Kendall's (Alicia Minshew) pregnancy and coma. In August 2006, Riegel's return to All My Children as a contract player was announced. The actress taped her first scenes on September 12, which first aired on October 11. Riegel commuted back and forth between her home and family in Los Angeles and New York, where All My Children tapes. In 2007, she parted ways with the show once again, but reappeared in the episode dated August 14, 2007, when Bianca phones in to check on Kendall from Paris, and in December for a Christmas visit.

In 2008, Riegel agreed to return to All My Children with Tamara Braun. Braun came on as Reese Williams, Bianca's new lover/girlfriend and later wife. Bianca first aired on October 17, 2008. Reese followed on October 30, 2008. Riegel's return was partly to minimize the effect of Alicia Minshew's absence on the show while Minshew took a two-month hiatus to get married. Reese and Bianca's union made history when it resulted in the first legal same-sex marriage in American daytime television. Riegel left the show again in February 2009, but also confirmed in an interview with Soap Opera Digest that she would be returning in spring 2009 to conclude the Reese and Bianca story.

In 2010, Riegel returned for a short-term stint for All My Children's 40th anniversary. The character had been cited as too iconic to recast, but in 2010, Riegel decided to permanently exit the role, and plans to recast were subsequently confirmed. However, on February 22, 2013, it was announced that Riegel will be reprising her role as Bianca in guest-arc on the Prospect Park's continuation of All My Children.

Other projects
Prior to joining All My Children, Riegel had a small role on the daytime drama As the World Turns as an AIDS patient, appeared in Law & Order and portrayed a minor character in the feature film American Pie. She sang and did voice acting work in the film The Prince of Egypt. She has also done some voicework for animated TV shows like Stitch! and Bleach. While portraying Bianca, she remained active in other acting avenues, doing a small guest role on American Dreams and appearing in the New York play The Sex Lives of Superheroes.

In 2008, Riegel joined the cast of Year One, a Harold Ramis film that stars Jack Black and Michael Cera. The film is a comedy about two men wandering through civilization during Biblical times, and was released in June 2009.

Eden and her brother, Sam Riegel, both voiced characters in the 2012 Vita port of Persona 4 Golden, voicing the characters of Marie and Teddie, respectively.

In 2008, Riegel starred in the web series Imaginary Bitches, portraying the role of "Eden", a single girl who deals with the lonely reality that her best friends are all in serious relationships by creating some imaginary friends...who turn out to be total bitches. The show is edited by Eden's half-sister Tatiana S. Riegel, written by brother Sam Riegel, and was created by Andrew Miller. In 2010, Riegel took over the role of Heather Stevens on The Young and the Restless. She also guest-starred on ABC's Castle, portraying the distraught sister of a man who is killed in the episode.

Personal life
Riegel is Jewish. Her older brother, Sam, is a voice actor and voice director in various animated shows and video games, and her half-sister, Tatiana (known as "Tanya" to friends and family), is an Oscar-nominated film editor for various television shows and films. Eden discussed the portrayal of Bianca with Tatiana, who is a lesbian, and with the producers of All My Children, in order to ensure that the character was not a stereotype.

In March 2007, Riegel became engaged to actor Andrew Miller, who had been a high school classmate of Cameron Mathison's (Ryan Lavery on All My Children). Miller and Riegel married on September 30, 2007, and their first son, Jack Oscar Miller, was born on May 21, 2011. In June 2013, Riegel announced on Twitter that she was expecting her second child, a boy. Her second son, Henry Isaac Miller, was born on December 20, 2013.

Riegel is a fan of the Toronto Maple Leafs, and is a close friend of actresses Rebecca Budig, Alicia Minshew, and Elizabeth Hendrickson.

Filmography

Films

Television

Video games

Awards and nominations

On April 14, 2009, the 13th Annual Webby Award Nominations were announced. Riegel was nominated for her work on Imaginary Bitches in the Best Individual Performance category.  Andrew Miller received an Official Honoree Selection for Best Writing.  Riegel was announced on May 5, 2009 as the winner of the Best Individual Performance People's Voice Award.  Her acceptance speech, which was limited to five words, was: "I'm sleeping with the director."

See also
Bianca Montgomery and Maggie Stone
Lena Kundera and Bianca Montgomery
Reese Williams and Bianca Montgomery
Supercouple

References

External links

Soap Opera Central's article about Eden Riegel's return to All My Children in May

1981 births
Living people
Actresses from Virginia
Actresses from Washington, D.C.
American child actresses
American soap opera actresses
American stage actresses
American television actresses
American video game actresses
American voice actresses
American voice directors
Daytime Emmy Award for Outstanding Younger Actress in a Drama Series winners
Daytime Emmy Award winners
Harvard University alumni
Jewish American actresses
20th-century American actresses
21st-century American actresses
21st-century American Jews